Jayne Denham is an Australian country singer-songwriter. In 2008, Denham won the Australian Independent Country Music Award for Best Rising Star. Denham has achieved 6 Top 10 songs in the National Country Charts and has received 2 CMAA Golden Guitar Award Nominations. Denham has scored 4 #1 smash hits in Australia, 6 Top 10 songs in the National Country Charts, 12 Top 30 videos, and 6 Country Music Channel (CMC) nominations.

Career
Five-time Golden Guitar nominee Jayne Denham is one of Australia's most admired and sought-after country rock performers. Her 5th Album WANTED came out of the gate firing all the bullets, reaching #1 Aria Australian Country Album and #2 on the Air Australian Indie charts after Jimmy Barnes "Flesh & Blood". WANTED has been hailed as a Country rock Opera full of sound effects and is a musical journey with a big serving of spaghetti Western on the side. The album landed her 2x Golden Guitar Awards for Female Artist of the Year, and Contemporary Album of the Year. Denham has scored 4 #1 smash hits in Australia, 6 Top 10 songs in the National Country Charts, 12 Top 30 videos, and 6 Country Music Channel (CMC) nominations. Jayne recorded her album Calamity in the home studio of Rascal Flatts’ Jay De Marcus, who played bass on the album.  

Jayne is the newest signing to Velvet Stone Management, a division of Dead Horse Branding based in Sydney, AU and Nashville, TN.

Discography

Albums

Extended plays

Awards and nominations

Australian Independent Country Music Awards

|-
| 2008 || Jayne Denham || Best Rising Star Award ||  
|-

References

Living people
Australian country singers
Australian women singers
Year of birth missing (living people)